Maharaja  Ganda Singh Dhillon (died 1776) was a famous Jat Sikh warrior of the late 18th century. Moreover, he was Maharaja of Amritsar, Lahore, Multan, Chiniot, Jhang, Bhera, Rawalpindi, Hasan Abdal, Sialkot and Gujrat, Pakistan. His father was Hari Singh Dhillon, an admired Sikh warrior. He also had a famous warrior brother Jhanda Singh Dhillon. He was appointed commander in chief of the forces by his older brother Jhanda Singh and after his death he became leader and Maharaja of the principality.

See also 
 Sikh Confederacy
 Misl

References 

The Sikh Commonwealth or Rise and Fall of Sikh Misls. Edition:2001.

Indian Sikhs
Jat rulers
1776 deaths
People of the Sikh Empire
Year of birth unknown